Archibald John Frederick Whitfield (3 March 1900 – 30 June 1952) was an Australian rules footballer who played for the Footscray Football Club in the Victorian Football League (VFL).

Notes

External links 

1900 births
1952 deaths
Australian rules footballers from Victoria (Australia)
Western Bulldogs players
Australian military personnel of World War I